This is a list of secondary schools in Singapore. Most secondary schools in Singapore offer a four-year Express course (Special course for Special Assistance Plan schools) or a five-year course leading to the Singapore-Cambridge GCE Ordinary Level. Some schools offer the six-year Integrated Programme, which lead to the Singapore-Cambridge GCE Advanced Level or International Baccalaureate Diploma.

Autonomous schools have more autonomy as compared to other government-run secondary schools to plan their own curriculum and activities. However, such schools may charge additional, miscellaneous fees on top of the regular school fees paid by all students attending government or government-aided schools.

Independent schools are granted autonomy to its own school curriculum, programmes and school fees.

Mainstream schools

Religious Schools

Christian schools

Madrasah

Special Schools for N(T) Students

Secondary Schools with Special-Need Streams
 Assumption Pathway School
 Northlight School
 Pathlight School

See also

 List of schools in Singapore

References

External links
 School Information Service

 secondary schools
Secondary